Cox's Bazar Medical College is a government medical school in Bangladesh, established in 2008. It is located in Cox's Bazar.
 
There are two separate Hostels for Male & Female students with all sorts of facilities. The students can perform all sorts of their professional competence at 250 bedded Cox's Bazar District Sadar Hospital, the temporary facility for Medical College Hospital. It has all the major branches of medical education.

It's an WDOMS enlisted Medical School

History
In the year 1978–1979 Bangladesh government planned to establish medical colleges at Bogra, Comilla, Dinajpur, Faridpur, Kushtia, Khulna, Noakhali and Pabna with a view to improve the healthcare services in the country. Subsequently, the programme was abandoned. Than the government felt the need for more medical colleges for medical education facilities. Accordingly, the government committed to establish five new medical colleges at Pabna, Jessore, Noakhali, Cox's Bazar and Rangamati with annual intakes of 50 students at each. The college was established in 2008. In 2008 it started educational service in a part of general hospital.

Campus
Cox's Bazar Medical College moved to the permanent campus with its own Academic buildings and hostels for students in 2017.
There is a Mosque and a beautiful Shaheed Minar.

The whole Campus is secured under 24 hours CCTV surveillance.

It has a 250-bed hospital where the students do their internship after completing the 5-year MBBS course. The work for hospital building will be started soon.

Administration
Currently there are 76 teachers working in different departments. Prof. Dr. Subas Chandra Saha is the current principal.

Cox's Bazar Medical College is affiliated under Chittagong Medical University. The students receive MBBS degree from Chittagong University after completion of their fifth year and passing the final Professional MBBS examination. The Professional examinations are held under the university and results are given thereby. Internal examinations are also taken on regular interval namely Card completions, term end and regular assessments.

From the MBBS Session 2017–18, Affiliation of Cox's Bazar Medical College has been changed to the newly established Chittagong Medical University.

Departments

Admission
Cox's Bazar Medical College admits 70 students into the MBBS programme yearly under the government medical admission test. Admission of Cox's Bazar Medical College is administrated by Directorate General of Health Services (DGHS) under the Ministry of Health, Government of Bangladesh  and curriculum by Bangladesh Medical and Dental Council.

Basic requirement for admission is that a candidate must have passed Secondary School Certificate (SSC)/'O' Level and Higher School Certificate (HSC)/'A' Level or their equivalent examinations although the minimum grade points required vary from year to year. It is also required that a candidate must have Biology, Chemistry and Physics among the subjects taken in HSC.

The admission test is conducted centrally by Director of Medical Education under DGHS. The test comprises a written MCQ exam, which is held simultaneously in all government medical colleges on the same day throughout the country. Candidates are selected for admission based on national merit and district, whether they are sons or daughters of freedom fighters, and to fill tribal quotas.

Voluntary organisations
The students of this college are also involved in many extracurricular and social welfare activities. There are two voluntary organisations-

Sandhani, Cox's Bazar Medical College Unit
Medicine Club, Cox's Bazar Medical College Unit

They provide humanitarian works like free blood grouping, blood transfusion, Voluntary blood donation & vaccination campaigns, relief works, health awareness & free health check-up campaigns in the urban and rural areas etc.
These two organisations were pioneered by former vice principal Dr. Arup Dutta Bappi.

See also
 List of medical colleges in Bangladesh

References

External links
World Directory of Medical Schools

Medical colleges in Bangladesh
Hospitals in Bangladesh
Educational institutions established in 2008
2008 establishments in Bangladesh
Organisations based in Cox's Bazar